St. Barnabas Gaelic Athletic Club are a Nottingham club. It is Nottingham's sole provider of Gaelic sports (Gaelic football and hurling). It was founded in 1947, initially to provide a social outlet for Irish immigrants who had moved to Nottingham. It also attracts members from the surrounding region including Chesterfield, Lincoln, Newark and Loughborough. The club is affiliated to and enters into competitions organised by Warwickshire GAA. This region (for GAA purposes) today covers both the West and East Midlands of England, with its headquarters at Páirc na hÉireann, Bickenhill, Solihull.

St. Barnabas continue to have close relations with the school which has provided a steady stream of footballers representing for St. Barnabas through the years.

Club profile

History 
St. Barnabas GAA Club played its first games in 1947. Formed by a group of Irish immigrants in Nottingham immediately after the end of World War II who gathered to play informal games of hurling and Gaelic football on the banks of the River Trent, the club has won championships affiliated to the Warwickshire, Derbyshire and East Midlands County Boards, in hurling, Gaelic football and ladies' Gaelic football.

Taking its name from Nottingham's Catholic Cathedral and acknowledging support provided by local clergy (who provided playing kit and a pitch), the team initially played in green and red.

There may have been an attempt to form an "East Midlands County Board", but this came to nought and it is reported that St. Barnabas had affiliated to the Warwickshire County Board in 1949 to enable it to play more games. Within months it was providing players to the County Hurling Team and making an impact in club competitions within the county, reaching the final of the Breffni Cup (senior hurling).

In 1956, several GAA clubs in the East and North Midlands area came together with other, neighbouring clubs, including Lincoln, Stoke, Derby and Alfreton to form the Derbyshire & Nottinghamshire County Board.

Around 1960, Stoke relocated to Warwickshire and Leicester joined and the board was renamed the East Midlands County Board, which enjoyed ten years of activity before it folded in 1970, due to a lack of new players migrating to the region. At this stage four clubs remained, St. Barnabas, St Colman's (Derby), St Colmcilles (Leicester) and Geraldines (Lincoln). Of these only St. Barnabas had a hurling team and Geraldines were unable to field.

After suggestions of a link up with the Yorkshire County Board, St. Barnabas amalgamated with Derby (St Colman's) to form St Bridgets, playing in green and white stripes and affiliated to Warwickshire once again. When St Bridgets folded around 1973 Nottingham based players joined St Colmcilles in Leicester.

St. Barnabas was reformed in 1985, affiliating to Warwickshire and playing its first games for over 15 years in 1986 and its first games within Warwickshire for 30 years. Having left Warwickshire in 1956, the original club colours were now being used by another club, so after a couple of years playing in yellow, the club switched to maroon shirts and white shorts, which they have played in since.

The reformed club entered men's football teams (intermediate/senior and a 2nd string junior team) along with under 16 and minor teams along with a ladies' football team.

When the hurling team was re-established in 2012, they adopted maroon and white hooped jerseys, so as to distinguish the team from the footballers, and in order to acknowledge input from a couple of neighbouring football-only clubs.

Structure 
Today St. Barnabas GAA Club fields a men's senior football team in Warwickshire's senior competitions, a hurling team, a ladies' football team and the club also caters for underage/juvenile players.

Home matches are played at Victoria Embankment.

The club has provided numerous players to Warwickshire's men's and ladies football teams and hurling teams down through the years.

Honours

Men's football 

 Warwickshire Senior Football league winners (Chris Holden Cup) - 1989, 2011
 Warwickshire Senior Football league winners - 1987, 1990, 2011
 Warwickshire Senior Div 2 Championship - 2017, 2018
 Warwickshire Senior Div 2 Football league - 2009, 2017
 Warwickshire Intermediate Football league winners - 1986, 2009
 Warwickshire Mick Sugrue Cup - 2018
 Warwickshire JFK Cup - 2011
 Warwickshire John Scanlon Cup - 2009, 2014
 Warwickshire Fr. Forde Cup - 2011
 Warwickshire Mick Mulligan Cup - 1985, 2009
 Warwickshire Dominic Downey Cup - 2009
 Warwickshire Reserve Football League - 2012
 Warwickshire Reserve Football Championship - 2012
 Warwickshire Minor Football Championship - 1987
 East Mids Senior Football Champions - 1965
 East Mids Junior Football Champions - 1965
 East Mids Senior Football League - 1967

Men's hurling 

 All-Britain Hurling Shield - 2015
 Warwickshire junior hurling champions - 1954
 Derbyshire hurling champions - 1956, 1957 & 1958
 East Mids Hurling Champions - 1964 1967 (last East Mids Hurling championship)
 East Mids Hurling League Winners - 1965

Ladies' football 

 Football Championship - 2012, 2015
 Football League - 2012, 2015

References

Sport in Nottingham
 Gaelic Football clubs in Britain
 Hurling clubs in Britain